Michelangelo "Mike" Volpi (born 13 December 1966) is an Italian-American businessman and venture capitalist. 
He worked as an engineer, eventually becoming chief strategy officer at Cisco Systems during the company’s growth era, acquiring over 70 companies in less than five years.
He co-founded Index Ventures’ San Francisco office with Danny Rimer in 2009.

Early life
Volpi was born in Milan, Italy. When he was five, his family moved to Tokyo, Japan, where he lived until he moved to the United States in 1984 to attend college. 
He earned a BS in mechanical engineering (1984-1988) and an MS in manufacturing systems engineering (1988-1989) from Stanford University.

Volpi began his career at Hewlett Packard's optoelectronics division in 1989 where he was both in engineering and marketing.
While at HP, he met his future wife Toni C. Cupal.
He returned to Stanford to earn an M.B.A. from the Graduate School of Business (1992-1994).

Cisco 
Volpi joined Cisco Systems in 1994 in the nascent business development group.  He was promoted to leading acquisitions at Cisco starting in April 1996.  As chief strategy officer he led corporate strategy, business development, and strategic alliances. Their acquisition strategy of Volpi and his team at Cisco is used as model for technology mergers and acquisitions.   he was promoted to the chief strategy office working for CEO John Chambers until 2000.  Some press speculated he was heir apparent to Chambers.

Moving into an operational role as a senior vice president and general manager, he led the routing and switching teams, then co-led the routing and service provider group with Prem Jain until 2007.
During this time Cisco's first Carrier Routing System product was announced, the CRS-1, in 2004.

Entrepreneur 
After Cisco in 2007 he became entrepreneur in residence (EIR) at Sequoia Capital. 
A few months later, he was appointed CEO of Joost, an Internet startup focused on online TV which was founded by Skype founders Niklas Zennstrom and Janus Friis.  
In September 2009, a lawsuit was filed against Volpi by Skype’s founders in conjunction with the proposed divestiture of Skype from eBay.  The lawsuit was dropped in November 2009.

Index Ventures 
At Index Ventures, Volpi invests in early-stage companies, primarily across autonomous driving, enterprise and open source. Volpi has served on the boards of Index portfolio companies Big Switch Networks, Blue Bottle Coffee (acquired by Nestle), Confluent Software, Elastic, Hortonworks, Lookout, Pure Storage, Sonos, Ubiquity6, and Zuora.

During Volpi's time at Index, the grew its office in San Francisco to an equal presence on both sides of the Atlantic Ocean. From 2012 to 2018, the firm had six initial public offerings in the US, including Dropbox, Etsy, Sonos and Zuora, and has invested in early rounds of companies including self-driving car startup Aurora, Bird and Robinhood.

Other activity 
Volpi is a non-executive board member of Fiat Chrysler Automobiles, an independent director of European investment firm Exor, and was a board member of Swedish mobile giant Ericsson from 2010 to 2013. He served on the board(s) of Opsware (now HP), TIBCO Software, Skype, StorSimple, Cloud.com, and Clearwire. 
 
Volpi serves sits on the board of Castilleja School, an independent school for girls grades six through twelve in Palo Alto, California, and is a Global Advisory Board Member at Knight-Hennessy Scholars, an international graduate-level scholarship program for study at Stanford University. He served on the board of Witness, a non-profit organization that uses video to find human rights violations, and on the advisory council for the Stanford University Graduate School of Business.

Personal life 
Volpi is trilingual, and married with 2 children.
His father is Vittorio Volpi, an executive at the United Bank of Switzerland.

Awards 
Forbes Midas List: World's Smartest Tech Investors, 2015
 MIT Technology Review - Innovators Under 35, 1999
 Network World: 1999 Power Issue – 25 Most Powerful People in Networking
 The New York Times' and CB Insights' 2018 list of the top 100 venture capitalists worldwide featured Volpi at number 34.

References 

American venture capitalists
1966 births
Living people
Cisco people
Italian emigrants to the United States
Hewlett-Packard people
Business and industry award recipients
Stanford Graduate School of Business alumni
Stanford University School of Engineering alumni